Fredrik Bergh (born February 13, 1972) is a keyboard player and songwriter. He is also a founding member and keyboard player in the Swedish heavy metal band Bloodbound.

Bergh has written songs for/with and/or recorded with artists like Steve Augeri, Deen Castronovo, Steve Overland, Joe Lynn Turner, Phenomena, Revolution Saints, Bonfire and Anette Olzon.

References

Living people
1972 births